Liam Kennedy is an Irish academic, a professor and director of the Clinton Institute for American Studies at University College Dublin, since 2004.

Publications

As author
Susan Sontag: Mind as Passion (1995) 
Race and Urban Space in American Culture (2000) 
Afterimages: Photography and US Foreign Policy (2016)

As editor
Urban Space and Representation (1999), co-editor
City Sites: An Electronic Book (2000), co-editor
Remaking Birmingham: The Visual Culture of Urban Regeneration (2004), editor
The Wire: Race, Class and Genre (2013), co-editor 
The Violence of the Image (2014), co-editor

References

External links
Liam Kennedy page at UCD

Academics of University College Dublin
Living people
Year of birth missing (living people)